Mar-len Abigail "Abby" Sombillo Binay-Campos (born December 12, 1975) is a Filipina lawyer and politician who has been the Mayor of Makati since 2016. She formerly served in the Congress as Representative of Makati's 2nd District from 2007 to 2016, when she was replaced by her husband, Luis Campos. She is also the daughter of former Vice President Jejomar Binay.

Early life and education
Binay was born on December 12, 1975, as the second of five children and the second of four daughters of Jejomar Binay and Elenita Sombillo. She is the younger sister of Nancy Binay, a current Senator, and the older sister of Junjun Binay, the former mayor of Makati.

She studied at the University of the Philippines Los Baños and received her bachelor's degree in human ecology, majoring in human settlements planning. She continued to the Ateneo School of Law, earning her law degree in 2001. She passed the Philippine Bar Examination in 2002.

Political career
At a young age, Binay started her career at MABINI under former Senator Rene Saguisag as part of the defense counsel for the soldiers involved in the Oakwood mutiny.

In 2007, she was elected representative of Makati's 2nd District, succeeding Butz Aquino and passed several bills under her watch.

In the wake of her brother Junjun's ouster as Makati mayor by the Ombudsman of the Philippines in 2015, Binay announced her candidacy as Mayor of Makati, inviting Cong. Monique Lagdameo as vice mayor of the city competing with acting mayor Romulo Peña Jr. and Karla Mercado.

On 9 May 2016, Binay and Lagdameo won the mayoral and vice-mayoral election, respectively. They took their oath of office on 27 June 2016. Abby's first day as Mayor of Makati began three days later on 30 June, and by that time her father's term as vice president already expired.

As a result, Abby is the fourth Binay family member, the second female Binay member to administer Makati in 15 years since her mother Elenita, who served as Makati mayor from 1998 to 2001. She is also the second female mayor of Makati.

Personal life
She has been married to Luis Jose Angel N. Campos Jr. since 2008. They have one child.

References

External links
Profile - Makati Official Website

1975 births
Abigail
Living people
Mayors of Makati
PDP–Laban politicians
United Nationalist Alliance politicians
Members of the House of Representatives of the Philippines from Makati
People from Makati
University of the Philippines Los Baños alumni
Ateneo de Manila University alumni